"Beyond Vietnam: A Time to Break Silence", also referred as the Riverside Church speech, is an anti–Vietnam War and pro–social justice speech delivered by Martin Luther King Jr. on April 4, 1967, exactly one year before he was assassinated. The major speech at Riverside Church in New York City, followed several interviews and several other public speeches in which King came out against the Vietnam War and the policies that created it. Some, like civil rights leader Ralph Bunche, the NAACP, and the editorial page writers of The Washington Post and The New York Times called the Riverside Church speech a mistake on King's part. The New York Times editorial suggested that conflating the civil rights movement with the Anti-war movement was an oversimplification that did justice to neither, stating that "linking these hard, complex problems will lead not to solutions but to deeper confusion." Others, including James Bevel, King's partner and strategist in the Civil Rights Movement, called it King's most important speech. It was written by activist and historian Vincent Harding.

Background

King was long opposed to American involvement in the Vietnam War, but at first avoided the topic in public speeches in order to avoid the interference with civil rights goals that criticism of President Johnson's policies might have created. At the urging of people such as SCLC's former Director of Direct Action and now the head of the Spring Mobilization Committee to End the War in Vietnam, James Bevel, and inspired by the outspokenness of Muhammad Ali, King eventually agreed to publicly oppose the war as opposition was growing among the American public.

King delivered the speech, sponsored by the group Clergy and Laymen Concerned About Vietnam, after committing to participate in New York's April 15, 1967 anti-Vietnam war march from Central Park to the United Nations, sponsored by the Spring Mobilization to End the War in Vietnam.

Content
King spoke strongly against the U.S.'s role in the war, arguing that the U.S. was in Vietnam "to occupy it as an American colony" and calling the U.S. government "the greatest purveyor of violence in the world today." He connected the war with economic injustice, arguing that the country needed serious moral change:

King opposed the Vietnam War because it took money and resources that could have been spent on social welfare at home. The United States Congress was spending more and more on the military and less and less on anti-poverty programs at the same time. He summed up this aspect by saying, "A nation that continues year after year to spend more money on military defense than on programs of social uplift is approaching spiritual death." He stated that North Vietnam "did not begin to send in any large number of supplies or men until American forces had arrived in the tens of thousands", and accused the U.S. of having killed a million Vietnamese, "mostly children."

King also criticized American opposition to North Vietnam's land reforms.

Aftermath
King's opposition cost him significant support among white allies, including President Johnson, Billy Graham, union leaders and powerful publishers.
"The press is being stacked against me", King said,
complaining of what he described as a double standard that applauded his nonviolence at home, but deplored it when applied "toward little brown Vietnamese children."
Life magazine called the speech "demagogic slander that sounded like a script for Radio Hanoi", and The Washington Post declared that King had "diminished his usefulness to his cause, his country, his people."

The "Beyond Vietnam" speech reflected King's evolving political advocacy in his later years, which paralleled the teachings of the progressive Highlander Research and Education Center, with which he was affiliated. King began to speak of the need for fundamental changes in the political and economic life of the nation, and more frequently expressed his opposition to the war and his desire to see a redistribution of resources to correct racial and economic injustice. He guarded his language in public to avoid being linked to communism by his enemies, but in private he sometimes spoke of his support for democratic socialism.

In a 1952 letter to Coretta Scott, he said: "I imagine you already know that I am much more socialistic in my economic theory than capitalistic ..." In one speech, he stated that "something is wrong with capitalism" and claimed, "There must be a better distribution of wealth, and maybe America must move toward a democratic socialism."
King had read Marx while at Morehouse, but while he rejected "traditional capitalism", he also rejected communism because of its "materialistic interpretation of history" that denied religion, its "ethical relativism", and its "political totalitarianism."

King also stated in "Beyond Vietnam" that "true compassion is more than flinging a coin to a beggar ... it comes to see that an edifice which produces beggars needs restructuring." King quoted a United States official who said that from Vietnam to Latin America, the country was "on the wrong side of a world revolution." King condemned America's "alliance with the landed gentry of Latin America", and said that the U.S. should support "the shirtless and barefoot people" in the Third World rather than suppressing their attempts at revolution.

King's stance on Vietnam encouraged Allard K. Lowenstein, William Sloane Coffin and Norman Thomas, with the support of anti-war Democrats, to attempt to persuade King to run against President Johnson in the 1968 United States presidential election. King contemplated but ultimately decided against the proposal on the grounds that he felt uneasy with politics and considered himself better suited for his morally unambiguous role as an activist.

On April 15, 1967, King participated and spoke at an anti-war march from Manhattan's Central Park to the United Nations. The march was organized by the Spring Mobilization Committee to End the War in Vietnam and initiated by its chairman, James Bevel. At the U.N. King also brought up issues of civil rights and the draft.

The same year, King nominated Buddhist monk Thich Nhat Hanh for the Nobel Peace Prize, but the prize was not awarded to anyone that year. Thich Nhat Hanh, who publicly held a news conference in Chicago with King in 1966, was acknowledged for urging King to oppose the Vietnam War.

Legacy
In 2010, PBS commentator Tavis Smiley said that the speech was the most controversial speech of King's career, and the one he "labored over the most".

In popular culture
A portion of this speech is used in the track "Wisdom, Justice, and Love" by Linkin Park, from their 2010 album A Thousand Suns.

One of the eight "sound cells" in @Large, Ai Weiwei's 2014–15 exhibit at Alcatraz, features King's voice giving the "Beyond Vietnam" speech.

Excerpts from this speech are used in the songs "Together" and "Spirit" by Nordic Giants.

See also
Sermons and speeches of Martin Luther King Jr.

References

Sources

External links
 Full transcript of the speech from Commondreams.org
 Full transcript and audio of speech at American Rhetoric Online Speech Bank.

Speeches by Martin Luther King Jr.
1967 speeches
Anti-war movement
Opposition to United States involvement in the Vietnam War